St Bernard's Catholic High School  is a coeducational Catholic secondary school with academy status in Rotherham, South Yorkshire, England. Its official opening date was 26 October 1961 at 3 pm. The school motto is "I have come so that they may have life, and have it to the full" (John 10:10). The school prayer is the Memorare of Saint Bernard. The school was originally a 'Specialist School for the Arts', but now it has a specialism in 'Applied Learning' too. St. Bernard's allows students to study various  qualifications, such as GCSEs, BTECs and Functional Skills, with most qualifications being equivalent to Level 2.

Ofsted inspections
Since the commencement of Ofsted inspections in September 1993, the school has undergone four full inspections:

Headteachers

 Mr James Joseph O'Connor 1961 - August 1985 (Born Dublin, 21 June 1920; Died Doncaster, 20 December 2012)

 Mrs Siobhan Kent April 2017 – December 2022

 Mrs Kate Crawford January 2023 – present

References

External links 
 St Bernard's Catholic High School site
 Hallam Diocese
 OFSTED page for St. Bernard's

Catholic secondary schools in the Diocese of Hallam
Secondary schools in Rotherham
Academies in Rotherham